The United Church of Christ in the Philippines (Tagalog: Ang Nagkaisang Iglesia ni Cristo sa Pilipinas; Ilokano: Nagkaykaysa nga Iglesia Ni Cristo iti Filipinas) is a Christian denomination in the Philippines. Established in its present form in Malate, Manila, it resulted from the merger of the Evangelical Church of the Philippines, the Philippine Methodist Church, the Disciples of Christ, the United Evangelical Church and several independent congregations.
 
The United Church is a mainline Protestant group in the Philippines with around 1,500,000 members and 1,593 pastors in 2,564 congregations as of 2008.  Its main office is located at 877 EDSA, West Triangle, Quezon City. Metro Manila.

History

The Evangelical Church 
Presbyterian missionaries in the Philippines in April 1901 invited missionaries of other evangelical churches to a conference to discuss the possibility of working together in the proclamation of the gospel of faith alone as the only way of salvation for Filipino Catholics, Muslims and pagans. Representatives included those from the Methodist Episcopal Church, the United Brethren in Christ (UBC), the Northern Baptist Church, the Christian and Missionary Alliance, the Free Methodist Church, the British and Foreign Bible Society, the American Bible Society, and the Presbyterian Church.

The Evangelical Union was then formed on April 26, 1901. The evangelical churches agreed to call themselves “The Evangelical Church” (with the original denomination name in parenthesis below it). From 1898 to 1905 these are the mission churches joining in the agreement:
 Methodists (1898; most of lowland Luzon and north of Manila)
 Presbyterians (1899; Bicol, Southern Tagalog area, and some parts of Central and Western Visayas)
 Baptists (1900; Western Visayas)
 United Brethren (1901; Mountain Province and La Union)
 Christian Churches and Churches of Christ/Disciples of Christ (1901; Ilocos, Abra, and Tagalog towns)
 Congregationalists (1902; Mindanao, except for the western end)
 Christian and Missionary Alliance (1902; Western Mindanao and Sulu Archipelago)

Manila was opened to all denominations and mission agencies. The Seventh-day Adventist Church and Protestant Episcopalians did not join because they wanted to go to parts of the archipelago allocated to other groups.

The United Evangelical Church 
The United Evangelical Church was founded in 1929, which merged the Presbyterian, Congregational, United Church of Manila and the United Brethren Churches.

The Philippine Methodist Church 

After the foundation of the Iglesia Evangelica Metodista en las Islas Filipinas (IEMELIF) by Nicolas V. Zamora, a second major split occurred in the Methodist Church on March 23, 1933. About three years before, Melecio de Armas, a prominent minister had been accused by his colleagues of immorality towards a teenage girl, a church member. At the 1932 Philippine Annual Conference, a committee found the minister guilty and recommended his expulsion from the ministry, but the minister appealed the decision to the Appellant Committee of the General Conference of the Methodist Church of Phlippines (GCMCA). This Committee decided that it does not have enough evidence against the minister, so it acquitted him—thereby overturning the decision of the Philippine Conference. This brought to everyone's attention the subordinate position of the Philippine church. Bishop Herbert Welch, at the 1933 Annual Conference, declared the matter closed, and reinstated the minister.

As a result, a group led by Samuel Stagg, pastor of the influential Central Church (now Central United Methodist Church on T.M. Kalaw), and including five other missionaries and 27 ordained Filipino ministers led by Cipriano Navarro and Melquiades Gamboa, a U.P. professor, left the church and declared themselves the General Conference of the Methodist Church in the Philippine Islands (GCMCPI). All but 41 members of Central Church left their newly dedicated gothic cathedral. This group formed the Philippine Methodist Church, with Navarro as bishop. The church financially supported the Staggs and the other missionaries who joined it. Stagg and his former members formed the Cosmopolitan Church, which became the leading congregation of the new denomination. The independent GCMCPI elected Navarro as acting General Superintendent. In 1948 the Philippine Methodist Church was a constituent part of the formation of the United Church of Christ in the Philippines.

The Evangelical Church in the Philippines 
The Evangelical Church in the Philippines was formed in 1943 under the direction of the Japanese Imperial Forces. It brought together the United Evangelical Church; the Christian Churches and Churches of Christ (Disciples of Christ); the Iglesia Evangelica Unida de Cristo; the Iglesia Evangelica Metodista en las Islas Filipinas (IEMELIF) founded by Bishop Nicholas Zamora; the Iglesia Evangelica Nacional; the Philippine Methodist Church; some Seventh-day Adventists and other churches. It was the first union of churches under full Filipino leadership.

After World War II, former Presbyterians and Congregationalists reconstituted the United Evangelical Church. On the other hand, the former United Brethren in Christ, together with the Church of Christ (Disciples of Christ) and the independent congregations remained as the Evangelical Church in the Philippines. Because the Seventh-day Adventists were forced by the war to join the merger, they immediately left the Evangelical Church of the Philippines after the war.

The United Church of Christ in the Philippines 

In May 1948, the United Evangelical Church, the Philippine Methodist Church, the Evangelical Church of the Philippines, some congregations of the Iglesia Evangelica Unida de Cristo, the Convention of the Christian Church (Disciples of Christ) of Northern Luzon, the Iglesia Evangelica Nacional, and some congregations of the Iglesia Evangelica Metodista En Las Islas Filipinas (IEMELIF) joined together to form the United Church of Christ in the Philippines. Enrique Sobrepena of the United Evangelical Church served both as Bishop for Luzon and as Presiding Bishop.

This was the real culmination of the efforts of the Evangelical Union established by missionaries on April 26, 1901, to seek the evangelization of the Philippines through a common effort. In spite of the refusal of the United Methodist, Baptist and other independent evangelical churches, the UCCP was known to be the most visible sign of interdenominational and church unity in the Philippines.

In 1962, the conservative Tagalog Convention of the Christian Church (Disciples of Christ) decided to join the union of the United Church of Christ in the Philippines. It was proclaimed in an appropriate ceremonies at the General Assembly held in Cebu City. In 1998, Nelinda Primavera–Briones was the first woman elected as bishop of the United Church of Christ in the Philippines.

Faith and practice 
The United Church of Christ in the Philippines is trinitarian and believes in the deity, humanity, and atonement of Jesus.  It believes that the Bible, in both the Old and New Testaments, is the inspired Word of God and that salvation is by grace through faith, repentance and following after Christ.  The United Church of Christ in the Philippines view the Christian life as one of personal faith and of serious dedication to living according to the highest Christian precepts. Each person is thus to be born again, converted into a new life, and gathered into the church community. For them, the church is essentially the result of conversion and of grace, a gathered community of committed believers. It is not the mother of Christian experience or the source (rather than the effect) of grace, as in the Roman Catholic tradition. The church is, therefore, holy only because the faith and life of its people are holy.

The UCCP traces its roots in the Protestant Reformation, when Martin Luther, John Calvin and others led the movement to reform the Christianity. This is often expressed in the "Five Solas"—God's grace alone as the only way to be reconciled to God, faith alone as the only means of receiving God's grace, Christ alone as the ground of God's saving grace, Scripture alone as the only infallible authority for belief, and God's glory alone as the ultimate purpose for the lives of men and women.

The following distinguish the UCCP from other communions:
 Their concern for freedom of speech and conscience and for freedom from interference by any civil or ecclesiastical authority
 The primacy they give to Scripture in matters of faith, doctrine, and morals
 The authority they give to the congregation in church affairs
 Their concern for establishing social justice in political, social and economic life and
 Their active involvement and commitment to interdenominational activity as a protest against denominational exclusiveness.

Sacraments 
The church believes that there are two sacraments only: baptism and The Lord's Supper. The church takes a neutral position on the observance of feet washing, taking into consideration the various traditions brought in by the uniting churches. The 1948: Article III Historic Faith and Message states, " We do preserve all the heritage of faith brought into the union by each of the constituent churches and hereby declare as our common faith and message: 'Jesus Christ, Son of the living God, our Lord and Saviour.'"

Baptism 
The UCCP defines baptism as a sacrament of initiation into the church. They believe that baptism is not a means of salvation but a first step of obedience for the new believer. The church permits both believer's baptism and infant baptism. Infant baptism is administered only to infant children of church members as a sign of God's covenant of mercy. In recent times, infant baptism has given way to infant Pághahandóg (Filipino, “dedication“) ceremonies, thus reserving baptism for the time when the child can make a conscious decision to follow Christ. The church also recognises and accepts baptisms held in other Christian churches.

Disciples understood that baptism is a confessional expression of faith and repentance, rather than a "work" that earns salvation. Thus, they insisted that believer's baptism is necessary part of conversion and necessary for its validity. Local churches in the Tagalog and Ilocano regions established by their missionaries practice only baptism by immersion for adult initiates.

Lord's Supper 
The Church believes in the symbolic presence of Jesus in the Lord's Supper (Filipino: Santa Cena,  Banál na Hapunan, both meaning “Holy Supper”). They believe that it was given by Jesus Christ to his church as a way of remembering and proclaiming the sacrifice He made on the cross. It is a sacrament that contains an element of remembering and proclaiming Christ's death while at the same time looking forward to the time when they will enjoy communion with Christ in heaven. It involves solemn and serious self-examination. This includes confession of sin and repentance. Communion for them should not be received in a flippant or careless manner.It is the joyful feast of the Lord, hence, it is a celebration.

Each UCCP congregation is required to celebrate the Sacrament of the Lord's Supper once a month. In most local churches, communion is served in the first Sunday of the month. The observance of the Rite of the Last Supper of our Lord with His disciples is done every Maundy Thursday. Since the Disciples of Christ custom is to have the Lord's Supper central to every worship service, the sacrament is administered every Lord's Day.

Contemporary issues 
The Church believes that every man or woman should be accepted and treated with dignity, grace, and holy love, whatever their sexual orientation (biological sex of person attracted to). In 2014, the denomination voted to adopt a policy that "means that LGBTs should not be discriminated but should be unconditionally accepted...[and] Bishop Marigza confirms the openness to ordain openly gay and lesbian church workers." In 2016, the Iloilo Ekklesia congregation in Mandurriao, Iloilo City, held the Church’s first LGBT-themed worship service.

The Church has also allowed the ordination of women with full rights of clergy based on biblical principle: "There is no longer Jew or Greek, there is no longer slave or free, there is no longer male and female; for all of you are one in Christ Jesus." The UCCP, along with some other evangelical Churches, holds that when the historical contexts involved are understood, a coherent Biblical argument can be made in favor of women's ordination.

Worship services 
UCCP local churches typically have worship services three times a week: Sunday morning, Sunday evening, and Wednesday evening. Each local congregation has a great deal of freedom in the style and ordering of worship, and therefore services vary among different churches. The order may be very traditional and highly liturgical, or it may be very simple and informal.

Music plays a large role in most UCCP worship services, and ranges from chant to traditional Protestant hymns, to classical sacred music, to more modern music, depending on the preference of the local church. Scripture is read and usually preached upon, and an offering is usually collected. Services are often focused toward a time of prayer and commitment at the end of the sermon. Over the last ten years, an increasing number of UCCP churches have utilized contemporary worship services as their worship style. This may involve the use of a projector to display song, drums and electronic piano, clapping of hands, tambourine dance and raising of hands. More traditional UCCP churches use hymnals and may have a song leader or music director who directs congregational singing from the pulpit.

Mission, evangelism, and social concern 
The United Church of Christ in the Philippines has, historically, been a leading Protestant denomination in mission work. A vital part of the world mission emphasis of the denomination is building and maintaining relationships with Evangelical, Protestant and other churches around the world. Connection between evangelism and social concern was maintained by the UCCP. In 1952, the UCCP established the UCCP National Federation of Credit Unions to aid farmers. They also issued a Resolution Condemning Gambling and Liquor. Sobrepena approved, a relationship between the UCCP and the Orient Crusades (OC) International - Philippine Crusades. OC entered the Philippines agreeing to work in cooperation with UCCP leaders, to prepare converts for membership in the UCCP, and to avoid controversial doctrinal issues. They focused on mass evangelism and witness to students, and used film showings such as King of Kings to make contacts. Interested seekers availed of Bible correspondence courses. Sobrepena held mass evangelistic campaigns—notably in Laoag in November 1955, with the OC cooperation.

In 1973 to 1986, local churches allowed American missionaries from the Youth With A Mission to reorganize Sunday Schools and set up Sunday school programs. This international, interdenominational Christian missionary organization also promoted Christian movies in secular theaters throughout the archipelago. Many Filipinos from this time are in full-time Christian service today or are productive Christians. In addition, a number of indigenous churches were established among squatter communities in Metro Manila, in Baguio and villages in the Cordilleras.   Then the Philippine Campus Crusade for Christ, also an international interdenominational movement came in and started the evangelistic movement in the church that started the increase in church attendance and membership.

Some local churches, joined international fellowship such as the Covenant Global Church. Other churches involved themselves into the Evangelism Explosion, a ministry that trains people how to share their faith in Christ.

The United Church of Christ in the Philippines in Baguio City is an active member of the Philippine Council of Evangelical Churches (PCEC) . PCEC is the largest network of denominations, churches, mission groups and para-church organizations in the Philippines being involve in evangelism and defending the fundamental evangelical Christian faith.

Seminaries and affiliated institutions 
The denomination maintains affiliations with seminaries in the Philippines. These are:
 College of Theology of Northern Christian College in Laoag City, Ilocos Norte
 College of Theology of Southern Christian College in Midsayap, Cotabato
 Divinity School at Silliman University in Dumaguete
 Ecumenical Theological Seminary in Baguio City
 Pag-asa School of Theology of Brokenshire College in Davao City
 Union Theological Seminary in Dasmarinas, Cavite (in partnership with the United Methodist Church)

Universities and colleges 

 Apayao Community Learning Center in Kabugao, Apayao
 Brokenshire College in Davao City
 College of Maasin in Southern Leyte
 Dansalan College Foundation in Marawi City, Lanao del Sur
 Farmers Institute in Bonifacio, Misamis Occidental
 Ifugao Academy in Kiangan, Ifugao
 Jimenez Bethel Institute in Jimenez, Misamis Occidental
 Kalinga Academy in Lubuagan, Kalinga
 National Heroes Institute in Kananga, Leyte
 Northern Christian College in Laoag City, Ilocos Norte
 Philippine Christian University in Malate, Manila (in partnership with the United Methodist Church)
 St. Tonis College in Tabuk, Kalinga
 Silliman University in Dumaguete
 Southern Christian College in Midsayap, Cotabato
 Tabuk Institute, Kalinga
 Union Christian College in San Fernando City, La Union
 United Institute, Inc. in Daraga, Albay
 Pilgrim Christian College, Cagayan de Oro City
 Hinunangan Bethel Christian School, - Hinunangan, Southern Leyte
 Mindanao Institute, Cabadbaran, Agusan del Norte

Affiliated health care institutions 
 Bethany Hospital in San Fernando, La Union
 Bethany Hospital in Tacloban, Leyte
 Brokenshire Integrated Health Ministries in Davao City 
 Silliman University Medical Center Foundation Inc. in Dumaguete
 Visayas Community Medical Center in Cebu City

Affiliated service institutions 
 CONDORA in Damortis, La Union
 Haran House in Davao City
 NLJA Peace Center
 Shalom Center in Malate, Manila
 UCCP CENDET (Center for Education and Development) in Cebu City

Partners in Mission 
The UCCP is a member of the National Council of Churches in the Philippines. Currently, the UCCP has covenant relations with the Iglesia Filipina Independiente and the Iglesia Unida Ekyumenikal.

Aside from this, the UCCP is a member and have partnership relation with international religious organizations.

World and Continental Church Bodies 
 World Council of Churches
 World Alliance of Reformed Churches
 World Methodist Council
 Church Mission Society
 Christian Conference of Asia

Sister-church relationships are held with the following churches abroad which hold to similar doctrine and practice.

North America 
 Christian Church (Disciples of Christ)
 Presbyterian Church (USA)
 Reformed Church of America
 United Methodist Church
 United Church of Christ
 United Church of Canada

Asia and Australia 

 Presbyterian Church of Korea
 Presbyterian Church of the Republic of Korea
 Presbyterian Church in Taiwan
 Uniting Church in Australia
 United Church of Christ in Japan

Europe 
 Evangelical Church in Rhineland
 United Evangelical Mission
 Equmeniakyrkan Sverige (Uniting Church in Sweden)

Prominent members 
 Fidel V. Ramos, former Philippine president (Philippine Methodist)
 Jovito Salonga, former President of the Senate of the Philippines. (Presbyterian)
 Sonny Belmonte, Speaker of the House of Representatives, former Mayor of Quezon City (Philippine Methodist)
 Betty Go-Belmonte, founder of the Philippine Star newspaper (Philippine Methodist)
 Rufino Macagba Sr., founder of Lorma Medical Center (Evangelical United Brethren)
 Crispina Lorenzana - Macagba, co-founder of Lorma Medical Center (Evangelical United Brethren)
 Leticia Ramos-Shahani, first female President Pro Tempore in the history of the Philippine Senate
 Narciso Ramos, former secretary of the Philippine Department of Foreign Affairs (Philippine Methodist)
 Camilo Osías, former President of the Senate of the Philippines. (Evangelical United Brethren)
 Neptali Gonzales, former Philippine senator
 Juan Flavier, former Philippine senator
 Cynthia A. Villar, former representative of the Lone District of Las Piñas and now Philippine Senator
 Orly Mercado, former Philippine senator and former RPN 9 President and general manager (now hosting "Orly Mercado: All Ready" at Radyo5 92.3 News FM)
 Amelita Ramos, former Philippine first lady (Philippine Methodist)
 William Padolina, President of National Academy of Science and Technology, former Secretary of Department of Science and Technology,
 Ricardo Gloria, former Secretary of Department of Education, former Secretary of Department of Science and Technology
 Benito Vergara, a national scientist
 Teodoro Rafael Yangco, father of the YMCA of the Philippines
 Angel C. Alcala, Ramon Magsaysay Awardee for Public Service and former Secretary of the Department of Environment and Natural Resources
 Perfecto Yasay Jr., former Secretary of Foreign Affairs and former Chairman of the Securities and Exchange Commission
 Leonor M. Briones, former Presidential Adviser for Social Development, former former Secretary of Department of Education, former National Treasurer of the Republic of the Philippines and now Center Director, SEAMEO Regional Center for Educational Innovation and Technology (SEAMEO INNOTECH)

Prominent former members 
 Felix Manalo, pastor and evangelist of the Church of Christ (Disciples). Subsequently, left and became the first Executive Minister of the Iglesia ni Cristo (Church of Christ).

See also 
Protestantism in the Philippines
National Council of Churches in the Philippines

Notes

References

External links 

 Official Website of the United Church of Christ in the Philippines

Christian denominations in the Philippines
United and uniting churches
Members of the World Communion of Reformed Churches
Members of the World Council of Churches
Reformed denominations in the Philippines
Presbyterian denominations established in the 20th century
Methodist denominations established in the 20th century
Congregationalist denominations
Christian organizations established in 1948
Evangelical denominations in Asia
1948 establishments in the Philippines